Ren Mukunoki (椋木 蓮, Mukunoki Ren, born January 22, 2000) is a Japanese professional baseball pitcher for the Orix Buffaloes of the Nippon Professional Baseball (NPB).

Professional career 
Mukunoki debuted for the Buffaloes on July 7, 2022, against the Saitama Seibu Lions, where he allowed 2 hits, threw 7 strikeouts, and did not allow a run. In just his 2nd game against the Hokkaido Nippon-Ham Fighters, he was throwing a no hitter, when in the bottom of the 9th, with only 1 out to go, gave up his no-hitter on a single by Fighters infielder Ryusei Sato. Buffaloes closer Yoshihisa Hirano took over from there and struck out Kensuke Kondo to earn his 24th save.

References 

2000 births
Living people
Orix Buffaloes players
Nippon Professional Baseball pitchers